Pen-y-ghent or Penyghent is a fell in the Yorkshire Dales, England. It has a number of interesting geological features, such as Hunt Pot, and further down, Hull Pot. The waters that flow in have created an extensive cave system which rises at Brants Gill head.

In 2004 the body of Lamduan Armitage, dubbed by the media the "Lady of the Hills", was found near to the entrance of Sell Gill Hole.

Etymology
In the Cumbric language, exactly as in today's Welsh, pen meant 'top' or 'head', and y is most likely the definite article (the), exactly as in Modern Welsh y (compare Pen-y-berth 'end of the hedge/copse', or Pen-y-ffordd 'head of the road/way', etc.). The element ghent is more obscure, it could be taken to be 'edge' or 'border'. The name Pen-y-ghent could therefore mean 'Hill on the border' (compare Kent). Or else, the final element may be gïnt, meaning "a heathen, a gentile" (< Latin gentis; c.f. Welsh gynt), presumably in reference to Scandinavian pagans.

It is also acceptable to write the name as Pen y Ghent rather than Pen-y-ghent.

Geography
 
Pen-y-Ghent is made up of a millstone grit top upon a bed of carboniferous limestone. The summit acts as a watershed with water flowing east into the River Skirfare and on through to the Humber Estuary, and water flowing west dropping into the River Ribble, to ultimately flow into the Irish Sea. The distinctive rakes that adorn the hillside (particularly on the western edge of Pen-y-Ghent) were revealed during a great storm in July 1881. The ferocity of the water cascading down the hillside removed the topsoil and revealed the rakes beneath.

Hull Pot Beck rises on the western side of Plover Hill and flows into Hull Pot, which is the largest natural hole in England. The water then flows under Horton Moor before re-appearing just east of Horton in Ribblesdale as Brants Ghyll Beck, where it flows into the River Ribble. Local legend has it that the waters from Hull Pot and Hunt Pot cross each other underground without mixing. This is said to have first been noted when a sheep wash was undertaken in one stream thereby making it muddy, and the husks of oats being dropped into the other stream and both having exited into the Ribble without mixing together.

Hiking
The more direct route that traverses the southern 'nose' of the hill is the route usually taken by those attempting the Yorkshire Three Peaks Challenge, as the walk is usually (but not exclusively) done in an anti-clockwise direction starting and finishing in Horton in Ribblesdale. The other main hillwalking route on the hill heads north from the summit to reach Plover Hill before descending to join Foxup Road, a bridleway at the head of Littondale.

Pen-y-ghent is one of the mountains on the Yorkshire Three Peaks route.

References

Bibliography
 Bibby, Andrew (2008), The Backbone of England, London: Francis Lincoln Limited
 Ekwall, Eilert (1960), The Concise Oxford Dictionary of English Place-Names, 4th ed., Oxford: Oxford University Press

External links

 Computer generated summit panoramas Pen-y-ghent index
 Photos of Pen-y-ghent and surrounding area on geograph.org.uk
 Climb Pen-y-ghent from Horton-in-Ribblesdale

Marilyns of England
Hewitts of England
Peaks of the Yorkshire Dales
Nuttalls
Sites of Special Scientific Interest in North Yorkshire
Yorkshire Three Peaks